Mahmud Kolahi (also Romanized as Maḩmūd Kolāhī; also known as Maḩmūd Kalāghī) is a village in Takht Rural District, Takht District, Bandar Abbas County, Hormozgan Province, Iran. At the 2006 census, its population was 195, in 38 families.

References 

Populated places in Bandar Abbas County